Elephas hysudricus is an extinct elephant species and was described from fossil remains found in the Siwalik hills. It lived during the Pliocene and Pleistocene epochs.

References

Pliocene proboscideans
Pleistocene proboscideans
Prehistoric elephants
Cenozoic mammals of Asia
Fossil taxa described in 1845